George Huff may refer to:

George Huff (coach) (1872–1936), American football and baseball coach at the University of Illinois, manager of the Boston Americans
George Huff (singer) (born 1980), American singer, American Idol finalist
George Franklin Huff (1842–1912), U.S. Representative from Pennsylvania, banker, and businessman
 George Albert Huff (died 1934), merchant and political figure in British Columbia